Adrian Lucaci (28 June 1966 – 12 April 2020) was a Romanian footballer who played as a central defender. After he ended his playing career, he worked for a while as a manager at teams from the Arad County and president at clubs from the Romanian lower leagues. In 2019, Lucaci was rewarded by the local administration with the title of "excellence in sports" for outstanding sports activity and contribution to the development of football in the Arad County. Since 2014 until his death in 2020 he was president of the Arad County Football Association (AJF Arad).

Honours
Steaua Bucureşti
Divizia A: 1987–88

References

1966 births
2020 deaths
Romanian footballers
Romania under-21 international footballers
Association football defenders
Liga I players
Liga II players
Liga III players
Vagonul Arad players
FC UTA Arad players
FC Sportul Studențesc București players
FC Steaua București players
FC Universitatea Cluj players
Romanian football managers
Romanian sports executives and administrators
Sportspeople from Arad, Romania